Cryptoramorphus is a genus of death-watch and spider beetles in the family Ptinidae. There are at least two described species in Cryptoramorphus, C. floridanus and C. flavidus.

References

Further reading

 
 
 
 
 

Ptinidae